Tek Bahadur Basnet is a Nepalese politician, belonging to the Communist Party of Nepal (Maoist) In the 2008 Constituent Assembly election he was elected from the Salyan-1 constituency, winning 27421 votes, defeating Prakash Jwala.

References

Living people
Communist Party of Nepal (Maoist Centre) politicians
Nepalese atheists
Nepal MPs 2017–2022
Nepal Communist Party (NCP) politicians
Members of the 1st Nepalese Constituent Assembly
Members of the 2nd Nepalese Constituent Assembly
1965 births